Sandro Rosati (born 7 March 1958) is an Italian judoka. He competed in the men's half-lightweight event at the 1984 Summer Olympics.

References

1958 births
Living people
Italian male judoka
Olympic judoka of Italy
Judoka at the 1984 Summer Olympics
Mediterranean Games medalists in judo
Mediterranean Games silver medalists for Italy
Competitors at the 1983 Mediterranean Games
Sportspeople from Rome
20th-century Italian people
21st-century Italian people